Canal House is a historic building located at Connersville, Fayette County, Indiana.  It was built in 1842 by the Whitewater Valley Canal Co., and is a two-story, temple form, Greek Revival style stone building.  It features a pedimented front with Doric order fluted pillars.  It was built as quarters for the canal custodian and canal company headquarters.  It later housed a bank and was restored by Congressman Finly Hutchinson Gray and his wife, who resided there from 1936 to 1947.  It later housed the local chapter of the Veterans of Foreign Wars and is now a local history museum.

It was added to the National Register of Historic Places in 1973.

References

History museums in Indiana
Commercial buildings on the National Register of Historic Places in Indiana
Greek Revival architecture in Indiana
Commercial buildings completed in 1842
Buildings and structures in Fayette County, Indiana
National Register of Historic Places in Fayette County, Indiana
1842 establishments in Indiana